Pedro Luis Bruno (born 25 May 1988) is an Argentine cricketer. He made his debut in List A cricket against Namibia as the first of three matches in the 2007 ICC World Cricket League Division Two, but he had no success in any of these games.

In November 2021, he was named in Argentina's Twenty20 International (T20I) squad for the 2021 ICC Men's T20 World Cup Americas Qualifier tournament in Antigua. He made his T20I debut on 8 November 2021, for Argentina against the Bahamas.

References

External links
 
 

1988 births
Living people
Argentine cricketers
Argentina Twenty20 International cricketers
Cricketers from Buenos Aires